Millerton is a rural community in Northumberland County, New Brunswick, Canada.

Situated on the Southwest Miramichi River, Millerton lies on the river's north bank, several kilometres upstream from the city of Miramichi.

History

Notable people

See also
List of communities in New Brunswick

References

Communities in Northumberland County, New Brunswick